Maharaja Dham Dev Singh (SIKARWAR) (b.1460-1550s) was a Sikarwar Rajput king and the ruler of Vijaypur Sikri estate which was established by Sikarwar Rajput in year 823AD (known as Fathehpur Sikri)[1][2][3][4][5][6]

Maharaja Dham Dev Singh
Rao, Sikarwar
Reign	1504 AD- 17, March, 1527AD
Coronation	1504AD
Predecessor	Maharaja Jay Raj Dev Singh
Born	Rao Dham Dev Singh
1460 AD
Vijaypur Sikri, India
Died	1550s
Gahmar, Ghazipur, India
Issue	
Roop Ram Rao
Diwan Ram Rao
Full name
Maharana Rao Dham Dev Singh Sikarwar
Dynasty	Sakarwar
Father	Maharana Jay Raj Dev Singh Sikarwar
Religion	Hinduism
Rao Dham dev misir was the son of Maharana Jay Raj Dev Singh who was the ruler of Vijaypur Sikri estate. He had two brothers. His elder brother was Maharaja Kam Dev Misir who was the ruler of Pahadgarh estate and one younger brother named Vikram Partap dev Singh a.k.a. Biram dev Singh. Kam dev's father was given the parts of Pahadgarh estate, his coronation was in year 1462 AD. His brother Kam Dev also served as the Army Chief of his father's army. After the death of his father in 1504 AD, Rao Dham Dev Singh was crowned as the king of Vijaypur Sikri. Dham was made the ruler of Vijaypur sikri (known as Fatehpur Sikri) in 1504 AD, but later he shifted his capital from Vijaypur Sikri to a place know known as Fatehabad near Fatehpur sikri which is now in Agra district. While the youngest brother Vikram Partap Dev Singh was the one who used to handle the affairs of both the brothers' empires. After the death of Kam dev's father he became the Army Chief of his brother's Army Dham Dev.[1][2][3][4][5][6]

References

 Acharya Hazari Prasad Dwivedi Rachnawali, Rajkamal Prakashan, Delhi.
 Bibha Jha's Ph.D. thesis Bhumihar Brahmins: A Sociological Study submitted to the Patna University.
 People of India Uttar Pradesh Volume XLII Part Two edited by A Hasan & J C Das pages 718 to 724 Manohar Publications.
Page 179 & 180 , census of india volume I ethnographic appendices(1903) by h.h. risley
Madarpur
16th century in India
Madarpur